Fenton Mercer Love (June 9, 1853 – May 13, 1935) was an American farmer, banker, and politician who served two terms in the Virginia House of Delegates, representing his native Loudoun County.

References

External links 

1853 births
1935 deaths
Members of the Virginia House of Delegates
20th-century American politicians